Richard Hosmer (3 January 1757 – 29 April 1820) was an English cricketer who played mainly for Kent sides.

Hosmer was born at Mereworth in Kent in 1757. He played in 18 matches which have been given first-class cricket status between 1780 and 1791 for various Kent and Gentlemen's XIs. He died at Mereworth in 1820.

References

English cricketers
Kent cricketers
English cricketers of 1701 to 1786
1757 births
1820 deaths
English cricketers of 1787 to 1825
Gentlemen of England cricketers
West Kent cricketers
East Kent cricketers
Gentlemen of Kent cricketers
Non-international England cricketers
People from Mereworth